Arjun Aamar Naam is a Bengali language action drama film directed by Prabir Nandi and produced by Jayanta Bhattacharya. This film was released in 2003 in the banner of  Angel Digital Private Limited.

Plot
Arjun lives in a village. He lost his father and lives with his mother and maternal uncles. He is very helpful hence become popular to the villagers. He faces a lot of problem and obstacles from the rich and powerful persons of the village. At the end he overcomes all the problems and finds his own family.

Cast
 Soumitra Chatterjee
 Supriya Devi
 Sukhen Das
 Abhishek Chatterjee
 Santu Mukhopadhyay
 Shambhu Bhattacharya
 Anuradha Ray
 Anamika Saha
 Shrestha Mukherjee
 Paran Bandopadhyay
 Ramaprasad Banik

References

External links
 

2003 films
2000s Bengali-language films
Bengali-language Indian films
Indian drama films